The Saturday Show was an Australian live variety television series that aired for three months during 1959 on ABC's Melbourne station. It was originally hosted by Shirley Broadway, later by Rosemary Butler, and finally by Bambi Smith. It debuted 3 October 1959.

One episode featured as guests pianist Ted Preston, saxophonist Eddie Oxley, vocal group The Moontones, and vocalists Reg Gray and Betty Bally.

References

External links
The Saturday Show on IMDb

1959 Australian television series debuts
1959 Australian television series endings
Black-and-white Australian television shows
English-language television shows
Australian variety television shows
Australian Broadcasting Corporation original programming